The Professional Achievement Award is a special Hong Kong Film Award presented to recipients who have contributed greatly to the Hong Kong cinema both behind or on camera.

Recipients

References

External links
 Hong Kong Film Awards Official Site

Awards established in 1990
Hong Kong Film Awards